Theodore Stark "Ping" Wilkinson (December 22, 1888 – February 21, 1946) was a Vice-Admiral of the United States Navy during World War II. He also received the Medal of Honor for his actions in Veracruz, Mexico.

Early life and career

After attending St. Paul's School in Concord, New Hampshire, where his writings for school publications evinced an early interest in naval and amphibious warfare, Wilkinson entered the United States Naval Academy in 1905 and graduated first in the class of 1909. He enrolled at George Washington University, Washington, D.C., joining Phi Sigma Kappa fraternity, and was instructed under the auspices of the Navy's Bureau of Ordnance (BuOrd). Wilkinson reported to the battleship  on July 25, 1913, for sea duty. During his time in that dreadnought, Ens. Wilkinson led Floridas 2d Company in action during the landings on 21 and April 22, 1914, at Veracruz, Mexico. For his skillful and courageous leadership of that unit of the battleship's landing force and his exhibition of "eminent and conspicuous" conduct, he received the Medal of Honor.

World War I and interwar years
On August 4, he was transferred to the armored cruiser , and two days later sailed eastward in her across the Atlantic. Subsequently, the young officer had tours of sea duty: first as aide, to Commander, 2d Division, Atlantic Fleet, and then as aide to the commander of the 7th Division.

From July 1916 to July 1919, Wilkinson served with distinction as the head of the Experimental Section, Bureau of Ordnance, where he developed ordnance materials and devices, most notable being a noxious gas filler for shells and an "exceptionally satisfactory smoke screen". Additionally, he was deemed largely responsible for the successful design of a depth charge and for the development of the firing mechanism of the Mark VI mine used in the North Sea Mine Barrage.

After commanding the destroyer  from January 1925 to December 1926, Wilkinson headed the Records Section of the Bureau of Navigation (BuNav) Officer Personnel Division. In June 1930, he became fleet gunnery officer and aide to Commander, Scouting Fleet (later, Commander, Scouting Force), Rear Admiral A. L. Willard. Detached from that duty in December 1931, he soon assumed the duties of secretary to the Navy's General Board. While in that assignment, Wilkinson had additional duty during the arms limitation talks at Geneva in 1933 and in London in 1934.

Over the next three years, he headed the Planning Division of BuNav and then returned to Indianapolis, this time in a staff capacity, as Chief of Staff to Commander, Scouting Force. In January 1941, he fleeted up to command the battleship .

World War II

Detached from that duty and promoted to rear admiral, Wilkinson was assigned as director of the Office of Naval Intelligence (ONI) on October 15. His new responsibilities inevitably embroiled him in the subsequent controversy over whether the US Pacific Fleet Commander at Pearl Harbor was sufficiently warned of the danger of a Japanese attack before December 7 – an issue on which Wilkinson testified for three days before a joint congressional committee in December 1945.

According to his testimony and that of others, ONI was responsible for collecting and evaluating intelligence,  but R. Adm. Richmond Kelly Turner, Director of War Plans, had sought and received the authority in 1940 to control information sent to the fleet on "enemy intentions" and "the strategic picture." Exercising this authority, Turner had prepared messages to fleet commanders on November 24 that "a surprise aggressive movement on the Philippines or Guam is a distinct possibility," and on November 27 stating that "this is a war warning…an aggressive move by Japan is expected within the next few days…indicates an amphibious expedition against either the Philippines, Thai or Kra Peninsula or possibly Borneo…execute appropriate defensive deployment."  Wilkinson had followed these messages up on December 2 with a message to the fleet commanders reporting that Japanese consuls were instructed to destroy their codes—a standard precaution for  hostilities.  No further warnings were sent to the US fleet until just before the attack on December 7, when hostilities had become even more clearly imminent from overnight decryption of Japanese "purple code" intercepts.

When asked for his opinion at the time about Japanese intentions, Turner said that he had always thought that there was a 50-50 chance that they would attack Pearl Harbor at the outset. The congressional committee noted that he was "the only officer in Washington in the higher echelons who thought so." Wilkinson, in contrast, admitted that he had believed it was more likely that Japan would strike first somewhere in the SW Pacific and avoid an immediate direct confrontation with the US – an opinion which the committee report found to have been widely shared by senior US officers before the attack.

South Pacific Campaign

From ONI, Wilkinson was assigned briefly as Commander, Battleship Division 2, Pacific Fleet, in August 1942, then as Deputy Commander, South Pacific, under Admiral William Halsey and General Douglas MacArthur as theater commander beginning in January 1943.  Halsey was designated Third Fleet Commander in March, and Wilkinson became Commander of the I Marine Amphibious Corps (later III Amphibious Corps) in July 1943.

In those positions, he is credited by naval historian Samuel Eliot Morison with developing  the US "leapfrogging" strategy designed to seize control of the Southwest Pacific islands occupied by Japan.  Rather than attack Japanese bases and fortifications frontally,  the strategy was to "hit them where they ain't," by occupying positions behind their forward outposts and cutting their supply lines. The strategy was so successful that Japanese war czar Tojo before his death told General MacArthur that it was one of the three principal factors that defeated Japan. (The other two factors were US submarine effectiveness and long-distance US carrier operations.)

Pursuing this strategy, Wilkinson earned the Distinguished Service Medal (DSM) for commanding the amphibious forces in the assaults on New Georgia, Vella Lavella, and the Treasury Islands; and established a key position on the west coast of Bougainville.  He was promoted to vice admiral in 1944, and won a gold star in lieu of a second DSM for his leadership in the assaults that took Peleliu and Angaur in the Palaus, and Ulithi in the Carolines.

Subsequently, Wilkinson earned another gold star in lieu of a third DSM, for commanding Task Force 79 (TF 79) in action in the Philippines between October 1, 1944, and January 18, 1945—operations that included the landings conducted by the Southern Attack Force on Leyte in October 1944 and at Lingayen in January 1945.

Ordered to the Navy Department in September 1945 for temporary duty, Vice Admiral Wilkinson became a member of the Joint Strategic Survey Committee of the Joint Chiefs of Staff in January 1946. He was serving in that capacity when he lost his life on February 21, 1946, in a tragic ferry accident at Hampton Roads, in which he was able to save his wife Catherine from drowning, but was unable to escape himself.

He is buried in Arlington National Cemetery and his grave can be found in section 2, Lot 3645.

Decorations
Medal of Honor citation
Rank and organization: Ensign, U.S. Navy. Born: December 22, 1888, Annapolis, Md. Appointed from: Louisiana. G.O. No.: 177, December 4, 1915. Other Navy award: Distinguished Service Medal with gold stars in lieu of 2 additional DSM's.Citation:'

For distinguished conduct in battle, engagements of Vera Cruz, 21 and April 22, 1914. Ens. Wilkinson was in both days' fighting at the head of his company and was eminent and conspicuous in his conduct, leading his men with skill and courage.

Ribbon bar

Vice Admiral Theodore Stark Wilkinson´s ribbon bar:

Namesake
In 1952, the destroyer leader  was named in his honor.

See also

List of Medal of Honor recipients (Veracruz)

References

1888 births
1946 deaths
People from Annapolis, Maryland
United States Naval Academy alumni
United States Navy Medal of Honor recipients
Recipients of the Navy Distinguished Service Medal
United States Navy personnel of World War I
United States Navy World War II admirals
United States Navy vice admirals
Road incident deaths in Virginia
Burials at Arlington National Cemetery
Accidental deaths in Virginia
Deaths by drowning in the United States
Directors of the Office of Naval Intelligence
Battle of Veracruz (1914) recipients of the Medal of Honor